Lysine-specific demethylase 5B also known as histone demethylase JARID1B is a demethylase enzyme that in humans is encoded by the KDM5B gene. JARID1B belongs to the alpha-ketoglutarate-dependent hydroxylase superfamily.

Function 

Jarid1B (also known as KDM5B or PLU1) is in the family of JHDM genes. These are responsible for demethylation of tri- and di-methylated lysines in the 4 position of histone 3 (H3K4me3 and H3K4me2). Jarid1B is a multidomain enzyme that is part of the subfamily KDM5. The whole Jarid1 family is a protein family that possesses H3K4 histone demethylase activity.

Jarid1B has been implicated in the development of prostate, breast, and skin cancer and also has been associated with melanoma maintenance. Knockout mice (Jarid1b−/−) produced are viable in neonatal life. These mice do exhibit the phenotype of premature mortality, decreased fertility in female mice, reduction in body weight and impairment in mammary gland development. It also acted to decrease serum estrogen levels and caused reduced mammary epithelial cell proliferation in the early stages of puberty. These Jarid1b−/− mice seem to be greatly affected in many regulators of the development of mammy development such as FOXA1 and estrogen receptor α. However, others have shown that a Jarid1B knockout embryos usually have neonatal lethality due to the failure of their respiratory system. Knockout embryos have also been seen to have several different neural defects including: disorganized cranial nerves, increased incidences of exencephaly, and defects in eye development.

Interactions 

JARID1B has been shown to interact with FOXG1 and PAX9.

References

Further reading

External links 
 

g2
Human 2OG oxygenases
EC 1.14.11